Luciano Rabottini (born 23 January 1958) is an Italian former cyclist. He won the 1986 Tirreno–Adriatico, and rode in 9 editions of the Giro d'Italia.

Major results

1979
 1st Coppa San Sabino
1981
 3rd Giro del Piemonte
 5th Giro di Lombardia
1982
 3rd Ruota d'Oro
1983
 1st GP Industria & Commercio di Prato
1985
 3rd Overall Giro di Puglia
1986
 1st Overall Tirreno–Adriatico
1st Stage 1
 6th Milan–San Remo
 9th Giro di Lombardia
1989
 1st Giro di Campania
1990
 8th Tre Valli Varesine
 10th Trofeo Laigueglia

References

1958 births
Living people
Italian male cyclists
Cyclists from Liège Province
People of Abruzzese descent